Nexcare is 3M's personal health care brand. The brand competes with Johnson & Johnson's Band-Aid brand in the adhesive bandage and first aid market. The brand also sells similar products such as bandages, gauze, surgical tape, cold sore treatment and liquid bandage products.

The brand has used a mascot called "Nexcare Nana", an elderly stunt woman, to demonstrate the durability of the products. Since 2017, they are an official supplier of USA Swimming. In 2018, as part of an ad campaign for the brand called "Tough Love" intended to prompt parents not to be over-cautious about their children's play, 3M signed American Ninja Warrior contestant Jessie Graff as a spokeswoman. The brand is also a sponsor of the American Red Cross's observation of World Donor Day  to encourage blood donation.

See also
Elastoplast
Curad

References

External links
 3M US: Nexcare Home

Health care brands
3M brands